Rossana Wandy Adão Tavares Quitongo (born September 15, 1990) is a team handball player from Angola. She plays on the Angola women's national handball team, and participated at the 2011 World Women's Handball Championship in Brazil.

She is currently playing for Angolan side Primeiro de Agosto.

References

1990 births
Living people
Handball players from Luanda
Angolan female handball players